Les Reines du Shopping ("The Queens of Shopping") is a French reality television show, broadcast on M6 since 10 June 2013 and hosted by Cristina Córdula.

Broadcasting 
The show is broadcast Monday to Friday at the end of the evening on M6. In Belgium, it is broadcast on the private channel RTL TVI.

It has so far run four seasons. The first of these was broadcast in June 2013 and the high audience ratings led to the second season being broadcast from October 2013 to June 2014. 

This TV show is an adaptation of the Turkish series Bana Her Şey Yakışır which has been broadcast in Turkey since 2011.

The narrator is the French announcer Hervé Lacroix.

Shopping Star is the Greek version of the show that premiered on 21 November 2016 on Star Channel and have been aired until now three seasons. The fourth series began airing in 16 September 2019. The Greek show is hosting by model Vicky Kaya.

Review
The newspaper Libération thinks that this show imposes a "standardized image of feminity" in which a woman dresses firstly to appeal to men, pointing particularly to the title of the season 3 show "Dinner at the restaurant with your boss and his wife" and the implied idea that it is the man who has the power.

References

French reality television series